Pardan (also Romanized as Pardān; also known as Pardūn, Ferdū, and Pherdu) is a village in Zohan Rural District, Zohan District, Zirkuh County, South Khorasan Province, Iran. At the 2006 census, its population was 498, in 130 families.

References 

Populated places in Zirkuh County